The Brunei Davis Cup team represents Brunei in Davis Cup tennis competition and are governed by the Brunei Darussalam Tennis Federation. They have not competed since 2008.

Their best finish is 9th in Group III in 1994.

History
Brunei competed in its first Davis Cup in 1994.

Current team (2022) 

 Aiman Abdullah
 Billie Kee-Loong Wong (Captain-player)
 Chung Peng Lim
 Ak Ahmad Dasugi Pg Hj Sulaiman
 Gavin Yeung Kok Lim

See also
Davis Cup
Brunei Fed Cup team

External links

Davis Cup teams
Davis Cup
Davis Cup